Abdelkader Mesli, born in 1902 in Khemis in French Algeria and died on June 21, 1961 in Paris, was an Islamic imam and resistance member during the Second World War. Through his actions at the Grand Mosque of Paris or at the Château du Hâ, he helped in the escape and rescue of several hundred Jewish people from the Holocaust.

Biography 
Abdelkader Mesli was born in 1902 in Khemis, French Algeria. At the age of 17, he left his native country for Metropolitan France and arrived in Marseille. THe worked as a docker, carpenter, mine worker and salesman. In the early 1930s, he was appointed imam of the Grand Mosque of Paris, a position he held on a voluntary basis.

When the Second World War started, he got involved with Kaddour Benghabrit, director of the mosque, in rescuing Jews by issuing false certificates of Muslim faith. He was also persecuted by the Vichy government. This technique saved between 500 and 1600 people according to different sources. In 1940, Abdelkader Mesli was seconded to Bordeaux as Muslim chaplain at the Château du Hâ. He organized escapes there and continued to issue false certificates, despite the suspicions of the Kommandatur. From February 1943 onwards, he became actively involved in the French Resistance; before that, he did isolated and uncoordinated acts.

On July 5, 1944, he was denounced and arrested in a restaurant in Bordeaux. He was deported to Dachau concentration camp, then transferred to Mauthausen. Despite extensive interrogations and torture, he did not denounce any resistant comrades. He was released on May 24, 1945, greatly weakened physically; he then weighed only 30 kg. He then resumed his activity as an imam at the mosque of Bobigny (near Paris) and took care of the Muslim cemetery of Bobigny.

He married in 1950 and had two children. He died on June 21, 1961.

Acknowledgement 
His actions were forgotten after the Second World War. It was not until 2010 that his son, Mohamed, rediscovered his father's past and undertook to safeguard this family heritage. Mesli has not been awarded the title of Righteous Among the Nations because precise research has yet to be done by the Yad Vashem memorial.

On March 12, 2020, the council of Paris voted unanimously for a street in the French capital to bear the name of Abdelkader Mesli. On October 15, 2021, the forecourt in front of the Grand Mosque of Paris bears his name.

Notes and references 

1902 births

1961 deaths
Dachau concentration camp survivors
French Resistance members
World War II resistance members
Islamic religious leaders
French Muslims
20th-century imams